Detlef Jaskowiak (born 15 February 1959) is a retired German football defender.

Career

Statistics

References

External links
 

1959 births
Living people
German footballers
VfL Bochum players
1. FC Bocholt players
2. Bundesliga players
Association football defenders